P. K. Jayalakshmi is an Indian politician and the former Minister for Welfare of Backward Communities in the state Government of Kerala.

Life

On 10 May 2015, she married C. A. Anilkumar, who is the grand-nephew of her father. Their marriage took place according to the traditions of Kurichiya tribe. She graduated  in BA English from Government College Mananthavady.
She became only the third minister in Kerala to marry while holding office.

See also
 Government of Kerala
 Kerala Ministers

References

External links
Chandy gets his team

1980 births
Living people
State cabinet ministers of Kerala
People from Wayanad district
Scheduled Tribes of Kerala
Indian National Congress politicians from Kerala
Kerala MLAs 2011–2016
Adivasi politicians
21st-century Indian women politicians
21st-century Indian politicians
Adivasi women
Sportswomen from Kerala
Indian female archers
Women state cabinet ministers of India
Archers from Kerala
Women members of the Kerala Legislative Assembly